The Wambool old-rail truss overbridges are two heritage-listed railway bridges on the Main Western line in Wambool, Bathurst Region, New South Wales, Australia. It was built in 1896. The property is owned by RailCorp, an agency of the Government of New South Wales. It was added to the New South Wales State Heritage Register on 2 April 1999.

History 
Constructed in 1896 over a single-span line but to spans ready for duplication which occurred in 1916.

Description 
Two old-rail Pratt truss overbridges (vehicular bridges over a rail line) either side of Wambool. Both bridges are constructed of steel with brick abutments.

Condition 

As at 20 March 2006, the physical condition is good.

Heritage listing 
As at 20 March 2006, the two old-rail Pratt overbridges that are good examples of bridge construction from the period of reconstruction of the line from Lithgow. Constructed in 1896 they represent the two major forms of bridge construction, steel and brick.

Wambool old-rail truss overbridges was listed on the New South Wales State Heritage Register on 2 April 1999 having satisfied the following criteria.

The place possesses uncommon, rare or endangered aspects of the cultural or natural history of New South Wales.

This pair of bridges are the only two old-rail Pratt truss overbridges in New South Wales.

See also 

List of railway bridges in New South Wales
Historic bridges of New South Wales

References

Attribution 

New South Wales State Heritage Register
Railway bridges in New South Wales
Articles incorporating text from the New South Wales State Heritage Register
Bridges completed in 1896
1896 establishments in Australia
Bathurst Region
Pratt truss bridges
Steel bridges in Australia